Nikolai Ivanovich Latysh (born 2 August 1955) is a Russian professional football coach and a former player from Ukraine. He is an assistant manager with FC Tobol.

Playing career
As a player, he made his professional debut in the Soviet Top League in 1976 for FC Shakhtar Donetsk.

Coaching career
From 26 June to 18 July 2018, Nikolai was an assistant manager with FC Urozhay Krasnodar.

Honours
 Soviet Top League bronze: 1978, 1986.
 Soviet Cup winner: 1984.

European club competitions
With FC Dynamo Moscow.

 European Cup Winners' Cup 1979–80: 1 game.
 UEFA Cup 1980–81: 1 game.
 UEFA Cup 1982–83: 2 games.

References

External links
 

1955 births
Living people
People from Oleksandriia
Soviet footballers
Ukrainian footballers
Ukrainian emigrants to Russia
Soviet Top League players
FC Zirka Kropyvnytskyi players
FC Shakhtar Donetsk players
FC Dynamo Moscow players
FC Spartak Moscow players
Soviet football managers
Russian football managers
FC Zirka Kropyvnytskyi managers
FC Arsenal Tula players
Association football midfielders
Association football forwards
Sportspeople from Kirovohrad Oblast